Comminuted may refer to:

Comminution, the process in which solid materials are reduced in size, by crushing, grinding and other processes
Bone fracture, as in a crushed or splintered bone
Comminuted skull fracture, with broken portions of bone displaced inward